The 2021 Big Sky Conference men's basketball tournament was the postseason tournament for the Big Sky Conference, held  at Idaho Central Arena in Boise, Idaho. It was the 46th edition of the tournament, which debuted

Seeds
The eleven teams were seeded by conference record, with a tiebreaker system for  identical conference records. The top five teams received a first-round bye.

Schedule

Bracket

References

2020–21 Big Sky Conference men's basketball season
Big Sky Conference men's basketball tournament
Basketball competitions in Boise, Idaho
College sports tournaments in Idaho
2021 in sports in Idaho